Alessandro Striggio the Younger (ca. 1573 – 8 June 1630) was an Italian librettist, the son of the composer Alessandro Striggio. The younger Striggio is most famous for his association with the composer Claudio Monteverdi. He wrote the libretto for Monteverdi's first opera Orfeo (1607), a landmark in the history of the genre, as well as the ballo (sung ballet) Tirsi e Clori. Striggio worked at the court of Mantua and died of the plague while on a diplomatic mission to Venice.

Sources
Timothy Dickey, "Alessandro Striggio (ii)", Allmusic.

1570s births
1630 deaths
Italian opera librettists
17th-century Italian writers
17th-century Italian male writers
17th-century deaths from plague (disease)
Infectious disease deaths in Veneto
Italian male dramatists and playwrights